After the ousting of the Taliban in 2001, repeatedly international conferences on the future of Afghanistan were held at several places. the first conference took place from 27 November to  5 December 2001 on the Petersberg in Königswinter near Bonn.

The major conferences were:
 International Conference on Afghanistan Bonn 2001
 International Conference on Afghanistan Berlin 2004
 International Conference on Afghanistan London 2006
 International Conference on the Rule of Law in Afghanistan Rome 2007
 International Conference on Afghanistan Paris 2008
 International Conference on Afghanistan Moscow 2009
 International Conference on Afghanistan The Hague 2009
 International Conference on Afghanistan London 2010
 International Conference on Afghanistan Bonn 2011
 International Conference on Afghanistan London 2014
 International Conference on Afghanistan Geneva 2020

See also 
 United Nations
 Politics of Afghanistan
 Summit (meeting)

References 

Foreign relations of Afghanistan
2000s in Afghanistan
2010s in Afghanistan
Afghanistan, International conferences
Afghanistan-related lists
Afghanistan, International conferences